Mukundpur is a village in Amarpatan tehsil, Satna District, Madhya Pradesh State, India.

Akbar II, the penultimate Mughal emperor of India, was born here on 22 April.

Satna is largest district of Rewa region.

The first white tiger of the world was spotted by Rewa Maharaja (King) Martand Singh in 1951, in this region.

References

Cities and towns in Satna district